A Night at the Met is the third official album by Robin Williams, released on August 9, 1986. It features segments recorded live at Metropolitan Opera House in New York City. The album won the 1988 Grammy Award for Best Comedy Performance Single or Album, Spoken or Musical.

The album was released the year before Williams' critically acclaimed performance in the motion picture Good Morning, Vietnam (1987). He had been shifting his focus from stand-up comedy to film making for several years, and A Night at the Met would be one of his last major concerts during the 1980s. The show is a mix of Williams' quick-witted humor and voice work, with rants on the topics of drugs, sex, world affairs, and parenting. References to the events and people of the 1980s are mentioned heavily throughout; U.S. President Ronald Reagan, Libyan leader Muammar Gaddafi, and General Secretary of the Communist Party of the Soviet Union Mikhail Gorbachev are central to many of the jokes.

Track listing

References

External links
 

1986 live albums
Grammy Award for Best Comedy Album
Robin Williams albums
1980s comedy albums
Albums produced by Brooks Arthur
Stand-up comedy albums